William H. Gesell (June 8, 1890 – June 6, 1956) was an American engineer, business executive and director of Lehn & Fink Products Corporation in Bloomfield, New Jersey, now Sterling Drug. He served as the 2nd president of the Society for Advancement of Management in the years 1937-1939.

Biography

Youth and early career 
Gesell was born in Jersey City, New Jersey in 1890, son of William Jacob Gesell and Laura (Thomas) Gesell. His father William J. Gesell (1865-1922) was one of the pioneers of Lehn & Fink, a New York wholesale druggists and manufacturing chemists. He had died suddenly after thirty-nine years at Lehn & Fink. Gesell attended Columbia University and the University of Michigan, where he  graduated from in 1911.

After graduation he started his career as engineer with Lehn & Fink, Inc. In the late 1910s at Lehn & Fink, Inc. Gesell supervised the completion of a new plant in Hoboken, N. J., including supervision of the machinery and power plant. After its completion William H. Gesell has been appointed general manager of the Lehn & Fink plant.

Later career and honours 
By 1924 at Lehn & Fink, Inc. Gesell was works manager, by 1931 Vice President, and by 1941 President of the company.

Gesell also served as president of the Society for Advancement of Management in the years 1937-1939 as successor of Ordway Tead, and was succeeded by Myron Henry Clark. In 1939 he was awarded the Taylor Key Award, one of the highest awards of the Society for Advancement of Management.

Selected publications 
 William H. Gesell. "Edible product and process of making the same." U.S. Patent No 1,475,574, 1923.

References

External links 
 Cosmetics and Skin: Lehn and Fink, about the history of Lehn & Fink.

1890 births
1956 deaths
20th-century American engineers
American business executives
Columbia University alumni
University of Michigan alumni
People from Jersey City, New Jersey
Engineers from New Jersey